Alfred Eastlack Driscoll (October 25, 1902 – March 9, 1975) was an American Republican Party politician, who served in the New Jersey Senate (1939–1941) representing Camden County, who served as the 43rd governor of New Jersey, and as president of Warner-Lambert (now a part of Pfizer).

Biography
He was born on October 25, 1902, in Pittsburgh, Pennsylvania. Driscoll grew up in Haddonfield, New Jersey and graduated from Haddonfield High School in 1921. He graduated from Williams College in 1925, and was awarded an LL.B. degree from Harvard University in 1928.

He served as Governor of New Jersey from 1947 to 1954 where he was a proponent for the New Jersey Turnpike and the Garden State Parkway.  From the time of their construction, these two major transportation links would transform the agrarian "Garden State" into the most densely populated state in the union.  The Driscoll Bridge on the Garden State Parkway across the Raritan River was named in his honor, and a failed planned extension of the New Jersey Turnpike (similar in nature to the Pennsylvania Turnpike's Northeast Extension) would have also borne his name.  Driscoll served as a delegate to the Republican National Convention from New Jersey in 1948 and 1952, and he was considered for the vice presidential nomination at the 1952 convention.

Driscoll, a Republican, gave William J. Brennan, a Democrat, his first judicial appointment in 1949. It was a seat on the New Jersey Superior Court. In 1951, Driscoll promoted Brennan to the New Jersey Supreme Court, where he served until appointed to the Supreme Court of the United States by President Dwight D. Eisenhower in 1956.

Driscoll died on March 9, 1975, in Haddonfield, New Jersey. Although he was a Presbyterian, Driscoll was buried at the Haddonfield Baptist Churchyard.

See also

List of governors of New Jersey

References

External links
Biography of Alfred E. Driscoll (PDF), New Jersey State Library
Political Graveyard info for Alfred E. Driscoll
 

1902 births
1975 deaths
Republican Party governors of New Jersey
Republican Party New Jersey state senators
Haddonfield Memorial High School alumni
People from Haddonfield, New Jersey
Williams College alumni
Harvard Law School alumni
Candidates in the 1948 United States presidential election
American Presbyterians
Politicians from Pittsburgh
Burials in New Jersey
20th-century American politicians